The Gillette News Record is a daily newspaper published in Gillette, Wyoming. It was founded in 1904, making it the oldest business in Campbell County. It has a circulation of 7,200 copies. Gillette News Record publishing also circulates an advertisement-only newspaper, the Gillette Advertiser.

References

External links
Gillette News Record
Gillette Advertiser
Archives of Gillette News, Campbell County Record, and Gillette News-Record from 1892-1922

Newspapers published in Wyoming
Campbell County, Wyoming
Companies based in Wyoming
Publishing companies established in 1904
1904 establishments in Wyoming
Gillette, Wyoming